Omptins (protease VII, protease A, gene ompT proteins, ompT protease, protein a, Pla, OmpT) are a family of bacterial proteases. They are aspartate proteases, which cleave peptides with the use of a water molecule.  Found in the outer membrane of gram-negative enterobacteria such as Shigella flexneri, Yersinia pestis, Escherichia coli, and Salmonella enterica.  Omptins consist of a widely conserved beta barrel spanning the membrane with 5 extracellular loops. These loops are responsible for the various substrate specificities. These proteases rely upon binding of lipopolysaccharide for activity.

Omptins have been linked to bacterial pathogenesis.

References

Further reading

Outer membrane proteins
Protein families
EC 3.4.23